Antonin Berval (1891–1966) was a French film actor. He is sometimes credited simply as Berval.

Selected filmography

 Notre Dame d'amour (1923)
 Arthur (1931) - Hubert de Fondragon
 Le costaud des PTT (1931)
 To the Polls, Citizens (1932) - Un électeur à voix
 Si tu veux (1932) - Renaud
 Maurin of the Moors (1932) - Maurin
 Les vingt-huit jours de Clairette (1933) - Vivarel
 L'illustre Maurin (1933) - Maurin
 Chourinette (1934) - Vernonet
 Roi de Camargue (1935) - Renaud
    (1935) - Justin
 Gaspard de Besse (1935) - Gaspard
 Le roman d'un spahi (1936) - Saint-Hilaire
 Notre-Dame d'amour (1936) - Jean Pastorel
 La tentation (1936)
 Romarin (1937) - Tonin
 Franco de port (1937) - Monsieur Fred
 Un soir à Marseille (1938) - L'inspectuer Francis
 Firmin, le muet de Saint-Pataclet (1938) - Firmin
 Une java (1939) - Yann
 Quartier sans soleil (1939) - Bébert
 Cap au large (1942) - Simon
 La chèvre d'or (1943) - Galfar
 Le cabaret du grand large (1946) - Le commissaire Thomas
 L'homme traqué (1947) - Victor
 Miroir (1947) - Folco
 Mandrin (1947) - Général La Morlière
 Triple enquête (1948) - L'inspecteur de police Thomas
 Si ça peut vous faire plaisir (1948) - Viala
 The Cupboard Was Bare (1948) - Grand Charles
 The Red Angel (1949) - Antonin Baretta
 The Ferret (1950) - L'inspecteur Vignolles
 Les aventuriers de l'air (1950) - Docquois
 Oriental Port (1950) - Capitaine Palmade
 Dakota 308 (1951) - L'inspecteur Baron
 Sérénade au bourreau (1951) - Inspecteur Léon Fourasse
 La Table-aux-Crevés (1951) - Le père Gari
 Au pays du soleil (1951) - L'inquiet
 The Wild Oat (1953) - Noël Courtade dit Courtecuisse
 Naked in the Wind (1953) - Farigoule
 Carnaval (1953) - Le commissaire
 Le club des 400 coups (1953) - M. de Saint-Febvrier
 Les détectives du dimanche (1953)
 The Blonde Gypsy (1953) - Léon Barcarin
 Dangerous Turning (1954)
 House on the Waterfront (1955) - Léon
 The Light Across the Street (1955) - Albert
 Speaking of Murder (1957) - Zé
 L'aventurière des Champs-Élysées (1957) - Pérez
 Paris clandestin (1957) - Bramati
A Kiss for a Killer (1957) - Le maire
 Les Truands (1957) - Le troisième fils Benoit
 Nuits de Pigalle (1959) - Bob, l'imprésario (final film role)

References

Bibliography 
 Goble, Alan. The Complete Index to Literary Sources in Film. Walter de Gruyter, 1999.

External links 
 

1891 births
1966 deaths
French male film actors
Actors from Avignon